Lophyra lineifrons is a species of tiger beetle found in Asia mainly along the northern Gangetic plains of India and into Thailand, Yunnan, Laos and Vietnam. They can be confused with Lophyra striolata which also overlaps with the species in northern India. Other species can be told apart from characters of the labrum.

References 

Cicindelidae
Species described in 1865